Jan Pieter de Lange (27 February 1926 – 9 April 2019) was a South African educationalist, chairman of the Afrikaner Broederbond, and a negotiator.

Roots and education
He was born in Fort Beaufort, Cape Province, South Africa. De Lange was born to Lucas and Helena de Lange. Helena was from the Kruger family. His grandfather Jan carried the name from the first de Lange who emigrated from Germany. He married Christine in the middle of 1953. She is from the Marais family and received her name from the Roux / Belling ancestors. He had two sisters, one Lucelle who died before him. He died in Pretoria on 9 April 2019.  He attended Aberdeen High School in Aberdeen and Gill College in Somerset East. De Lange studied at the University of Pretoria, obtaining BA (law) and BEd.  After graduating from the University of South Africa with a BA, he obtained a MEd and PhD at the Randse Afrikaanse Universiteit.

Working life
He was Vice-Rector at Goudstad College of Education, in Johannesburg (1967-1968) and Rector of the Potchefstroom College of Education (1969), in Potchefstroom. Both these institutions do not exist today after the rationalisation under the then-Minister of Education Kadar Asmal. In 1979 he became Rector of the Randse Afrikaanse Universiteit. He held this position until 1979. After his academic career, he became chairman of the HSRC Board from 1988 to 1995.

Broederbond
He was chairman of the Afrikaner Broederbond, a white, male Afrikaner secret organization from 1984 until 1994, when Tom de Beer took over from him.

Involvement through his career
De Lange had been involved in the education system in South Africa. He has been at the head of educational colleges in Potchefstroom and Johannesburg. He has also been the rector of a university. In August 1980, the government instructed the HSRC to conduct an investigation into all levels of education, with Professor de Lange being the chairman. His report was issued in July 1981. The main conclusion from his report is that all education should be equal, irrespective of race, and a single ministry should handle it.

As leader of the Afrikaner Broederbond, he played a role in the negotiated settlement reached in South Africa in 1994.

In 1985, de Lange realised that change needed to take place regarding the Apartheid system. The National Party  government did not talk openly with the ANC, and it was then still banned. On 8 June 1986, de Lange and Thabo Mbeki (from the ANC) met in New York for a meeting. The meeting's duration was 5 hours. After this meeting, other events followed, which were attended by like-minded people. For example one such event was the Dakar Conference. He also made statements that showed that the Afrikaner Broederbond was in agreement that the politics in South Africa should change. De Lange issued a discussion document to all members in which he stated that a negotiated settlement with a full democracy was the only way out.

Publication
 The de Lange commission report

References

1926 births
2019 deaths
Afrikaner people
Academic staff of North-West University
University of South Africa alumni
University of Pretoria alumni
University of Johannesburg alumni